Pilocrocis rectilinealis is a moth in the family Crambidae. It was described by George Hamilton Kenrick in 1917. It is found on Madagascar.

References

Pilocrocis
Moths described in 1917
Moths of Madagascar